Lin Po-jen (born 26 March 1981) is a Taiwanese softball player. She competed in the women's tournament at the 2004 Summer Olympics.

References

External links
 

1981 births
Living people
Taiwanese softball players
Olympic softball players of Taiwan
Softball players at the 2004 Summer Olympics
Place of birth missing (living people)
Asian Games medalists in softball
Softball players at the 2002 Asian Games
Medalists at the 2002 Asian Games
Asian Games silver medalists for Chinese Taipei